Bachman–Turner Overdrive is the ninth studio album by Canadian rock band Bachman–Turner Overdrive, released in 1984. It is the last BTO studio album of original material to date and the only one without Robbie Bachman on drums. He disputed some of the agreements for the recording and reunion, including the choice of Tim Bachman instead of Blair Thornton, and declined to join. Garry Peterson, who was Randy Bachman's bandmate in The Guess Who, plays drums on the album. The album was originally released on Compleat Records, but it is currently in print under the Sun Record label.  The leadoff song, "For the Weekend", was released as a single and also included an accompanying music video. Reaching #83 in the Billboard Hot 100, "For the Weekend" was the last BTO single to chart by any formation of the band.

Track listing
"For the Weekend" (R. Bachman) – 4:20
"Just Look at Me Now" (T. Bachman, Turner) – 4:38
"My Sugaree" (R. Bachman) – 3:47
"City's Still Growin'" (Turner) – 5:44
"Another Fool" (R. Bachman) – 5:29
"Lost in a Fantasy" (R. Bachman) – 4:11
"Toledo" (Turner) – 4:12
"Service with a Smile" (R. Bachman) – 4:21

Personnel 
Randy Bachman - guitar, vocals
Tim Bachman - rhythm guitar, background vocals
C.F. Turner - bass guitar, vocals
Garry Peterson - drums, percussion, background vocals

Additional personnel  
Will MacCalder - piano
Denise McCann - background vocals

Production
Producers: Randy Bachman, Bachman–Turner Overdrive
Engineers: Patrick Glover, Dave Slagter
Mixing: Dave Slagter
Digital mastering: Hollis Flatt, MC Rather
Digital transfers: Don Powell
Original design concept: Jim Ladwig
Illustrations: John Youssi

Charts

References

1984 albums
Bachman–Turner Overdrive albums